The Hartlepool Post is an online newspaper and forum serving Hartlepool and the surrounding area. It has an average of 50,000 monthly visitors to its site and 9 contributors. 

The paper opposes the whipped system of party politics in local Government and support Independent Councillors. Most of its content therefore relates to local politics and is often critical of the whipped parties. New sister sites for East Durham and Teesside are expected in 2013.

Popularity
Alexa Rank  2,937,116
Alexa Rank  9,855,331

References

British news websites
Publications established in 2002
Organisations based in the Borough of Hartlepool